The McLarty–Watts Ministry was the 21st Ministry of the Government of Western Australia, led by Liberal Premier Sir Ross McLarty and his deputy, Country Party leader Arthur Watts. It succeeded the Wise Ministry on 1 April 1947, following the defeat of the Labor government at the 1947 election two weeks earlier. It was significant in that it included in Florence Cardell-Oliver not only the oldest person, at age 70, to receive their first appointment to a ministerial post in Western Australia, but also the first female cabinet minister in Australia.

The ministry was followed by the Hawke Ministry on 23 February 1953 after the Coalition lost government at the state election held on 14 February.

First Ministry
On 1 April 1947, the Lieutenant-Governor, Sir James Mitchell, constituted the Ministry. He designated eight principal executive offices of the Government and appointed the following ministers to their positions, who served until the reconstitution of the Ministry on 7 October 1949. Two honorary members were also appointed.

The list below is ordered by decreasing seniority within the Cabinet, as indicated by the Government Gazette and the Hansard index. Blue entries indicate members of the Liberal Party, whilst green entries indicate members of the National Country Party. The members of the Ministry were:

First Ministry (reconstituted)

On 7 October 1949, the Governor, Sir James Mitchell, reconstituted the Ministry. He designated eight principal executive offices of the Government and appointed the following ministers to their positions, who served until the Ministry was reformed on 6 April 1950 after the 1950 election. As previously, two honorary ministers were appointed, with David Brand replacing Robert Ross McDonald in the Ministry.

Second Ministry

On 6 April 1950, the Governor, Sir James Mitchell, constituted the Ministry. He designated eight principal executive offices of the Government and appointed the following ministers to their positions, who served until the end of the Ministry. On 24 October 1950, following the assent of the Acts Amendment (Increase in number of Ministers of the Crown) Act 1950 (No.2 of 1950), the Ministry was expanded to 10 members and the two Honorary Ministers were promoted. The listed Ministers served until the end of the Ministry on 23 February 1953.

References

Western Australian ministries
Ministries of Elizabeth II
Ministries of George VI